Absinthiana are the accoutrements surrounding the drink absinthe and its preparation. Originally, absinthe was served in standard stemmed wine or water glasses and water was added from a simple carafe. But as its popularity grew so did the variety of implements used, such as specialty glasses and complex brouilleurs. In the period since absinthe was made illegal in the US, antique dealers have seen dramatic increases in the prices of these artifacts there. Some absinthe spoons can fetch thousands of dollars. Many 19th century companies used the elaborate barware to advertise their brands. Today, many contemporary distilleries are also producing decorative branded barware for the same purpose.

Absinthe spoon

A perforated or slotted spoon is used to dissolve a sugar cube in a glass of absinthe, usually to sweeten the drink and counteract its mild bitterness. The spoon is normally flat, with a notch in the handle where it rests on the rim of the glass. Originating circa the 1870s their use increased over the 1880s and 1890s and were often stamped with brand names or logos as advertising, much like modern alcohol paraphernalia. Sometimes they were sold as tourist items; for example, some might be shaped like the Eiffel Tower, such as the spoon Eiffel Tower #7, which was made for the inauguration of the building in 1889. 

A less common variation of the absinthe spoon is similar to iced tea spoons.  By contrast, these have a normal spoon bowl and the sugar holder built into the handle.

Grilles
Another sugar tool, the grille, lacks the overall spoon shape. Rather, it is generally a perforated metal saucer with three or more legs that hold it above the glass.

Water drip

Adding ice cold water to absinthe is the usual method of preparation, as absinthe is most commonly bottled at high proof with the expectation of being diluted to approximately the strength of wine.  The addition of water also causes a clouding, called the louche (called ouzo effect in other drinks).

Properly watering absinthe was considered by some to be an art form to be practiced with patience and finesse, and some bars were frequented by patrons humorously dubbed "" or absinthe teachers who, in exchange for a drink or a small fee, would show new drinkers how to properly add water slowly, allowing the fullest flavor and aromatic character to be obtained from the drink.

Carafe
A water carafe is the original, and the most basic, way to add water. As with other items, many have been found with brand names on them. The carafe is held above the glass and water is delicately added in a thin stream.

Fountain
Fountains appeared in bars and bistros in the late 1800s as absinthe gained greater popularity. Most often it was a large glass globe on a tall metal stand that held between two and six spigots. It allowed a small party of drinkers to accurately prepare their absinthe all at once with a slow, thin stream of cold water but did not require the steady hand required by a carafe.

Brouilleur
In some instances a device called a brouilleur was employed. A brouilleur is a glass or metal bowl which sits on the absinthe glass and acts like a personal absinthe fountain. Ice and water are added to the bowl, which has a small hole at the bottom, allowing the ice-cold water to slowly drip through. Sugar, if preferred, can be added directly to the bowl, or in some cases to a built-in grille.

Absinthe glass

Absinthe was originally served in normal bar-ware, but eventually specialised glasses became somewhat popular. These would commonly have a short thick stem and faceting or some other feature to indicate the correct portion to pour. Some were simply etched with a line or marked by a glass bead, showing how much absinthe should be poured, with another line or bead indicating the level to add water up to. The term 'reservoir glass' describes several styles of stemware with a distinct bulge at the bottom volumetrically equal to a standard shot or sometimes a half-shot, the remainder of the glass to be filled with water providing the correct ratio of admixture. They were among the first type of glass made specifically for absinthe. A less common variation, called the bubble-reservoir glass, contains a bubble-shaped reservoir connected to the glass by a narrow neck or portal, which allows the absinthe and water to slowly suffuse into each other, accentuating the appearance of the louche.

Modern absinthiana
A revival of absinthe began in the 1990s following the adoption of modern European Union food and beverage laws which removed long-standing barriers to its production and sale. As absinthe has re-emerged, so has the paraphernalia associated with it. Several companies produce replica absinthiana and several have modernized the traditional designs.  Whereas absinthe barware of the 19th century was primarily used as inexpensive promotional items, the modern versions are often cast of silver, or ornately manufactured to the standard of jewelry.

References

Absinthe
Drinkware